John Patrick Purdon (30 August 1930 – 23 August 2007) was an Australian rules footballer who played with Collingwood in the Victorian Football League (VFL).

Family
The son of John Patrick Purdon (1902-1970), and Christina Johnston Purdon (1904-1989), née Matheson, John Patrick Purdon was born on 30 August 1930.

He married Joan Thomas (1933-1969) in 1953.

Notes

References
 
 Measuring up to Standard, The Herald, (Wednesday, 8 August 1951), p.11.
 Goal Kicked after Siren, The Age, (Monday, 13 August 1951), p.12.

External links 
 
 
 Jack Purdon, at Collingwood Forever
 Jack Purdon, at The VFA Project

1930 births
2007 deaths
Australian rules footballers from Victoria (Australia)
Collingwood Football Club players
Northcote Football Club players